Pirates 2 can either refer to:

Pirates of the Caribbean: Dead Man's Chest, a 2006 film
Pirates II: Stagnetti's Revenge, a 2008 pornographic film